Ronald Green (רוני גרין; August 5, 1944 – July 2012) was an American-Israeli basketball player. He played the forward position. He played in the Israel Basketball Premier League, and for the Israeli national basketball team.

Biography

Green was born in Miami Beach, Florida, and was Jewish. He was raised by Morris and Florence Green.  He was 6' 6" (198 cm) tall. His son Erin Green also played professional basketball in Israel.

He attended Miami Beach High School, where Green played on the basketball team from 1960–1962, and was named All-City First Team.

Green attended Vanderbilt University (B.A. in Business Administration, '66; MBA University of Miami , '69), on a full scholarship. He played for the Vanderbilt Commodores from 1963–66. In 1964–65, the team won the Southeastern Conference (SEC) championship.

He played basketball for Team USA in the 1965 Maccabiah Games alongside Tal Brody and Steve Chubin, winning a gold medal, and in the 1969 Maccabiah Games, winning a silver medal.

Green played professionally in the Israel Basketball Premier League for Maccabi Tel Aviv in 1970–71, averaging 14.1 points per game.  He played on the Israeli national basketball team, winning a silver medal with the team at the 1970 Asian Games. In addition, he played in the Italian Professional League.

After playing basketball abroad, and marrying an Israeli nurse, Green returned to Miami to work with Green Brothers Food Brokerage, as well as an account manager with Buitoni and Haagen-Dazs. Green suffered from a rare disease known as multiple system atrophy.  Green married Carol Litman, a high school English teacher, in 1983. She cared for him as MSA took his life.

References 

1944 births
2012 deaths
Competitors at the 1965 Maccabiah Games
Deaths from multiple system atrophy
Forwards (basketball)
Israeli men's basketball players
Maccabiah Games gold medalists for the United States
Maccabiah Games medalists in basketball
Maccabi Tel Aviv B.C. players
Sportspeople from Miami Beach, Florida
American men's basketball players
Basketball players from Florida
Competitors at the 1969 Maccabiah Games
Israeli Basketball Premier League players
Maccabiah Games silver medalists for the United States
Vanderbilt Commodores men's basketball players
Basketball players at the 1970 Asian Games
Medalists at the 1970 Asian Games
Asian Games medalists in basketball
Asian Games silver medalists for Israel
Neurological disease deaths in the United States